There are several proposed types of exotic matter:

 Hypothetical particles and states of matter that have "exotic" physical properties that would violate known laws of physics, such as a particle having a negative mass.
 Hypothetical particles and states of matter that have not yet been encountered, but whose properties would be within the realm of mainstream physics if found to exist. 
 Several particles whose existence has been experimentally confirmed that are conjectured to be exotic hadrons and within the Standard Model.
 States of matter that are not commonly encountered, such as Bose–Einstein condensates, fermionic condensates, nuclear matter, quantum spin liquid, string-net liquid, supercritical fluid, color-glass condensate,  quark–gluon plasma, Rydberg matter, Rydberg polaron, photonic matter, and time crystal but whose properties are entirely within the realm of mainstream physics.
 Forms of matter that are poorly understood, such as dark matter and mirror matter.
 Ordinary matter placed under high pressure, which may result in dramatic changes in its physical or chemical properties.
 Degenerate matter
 Exotic atoms

Negative mass 

Negative mass would possess some strange properties, such as accelerating in the direction opposite of applied force. Despite being inconsistent with the expected behavior of "normal" matter, negative mass is mathematically consistent and introduces no violation of conservation of momentum or energy. It is used in certain speculative theories, such as on the construction of artificial wormholes and the Alcubierre drive. The closest known real representative of such exotic matter is the region of pseudo-negative-pressure density produced by the Casimir effect.

Complex mass 

A hypothetical particle with complex rest mass would always travel faster than the speed of light. Such particles are called tachyons. There is no confirmed existence of tachyons.

 

If the rest mass  is complex this implies that the denominator is complex because the total energy is observable and thus must be real. Therefore, the quantity under the square root must be negative, which can only happen if v is greater than c. As noted by Gregory Benford et al., special relativity implies that tachyons, if they existed, could be used to communicate backwards in time (see tachyonic antitelephone). Because time travel is considered to be non-physical, tachyons are believed by physicists either not to exist, or else to be incapable of interacting with normal matter.

In quantum field theory, complex mass would induce tachyon condensation.

Materials at high pressure 
The materials are thermodynamically stable at high pressures. Such compounds may exist in natural environments that exist at high pressure, such as the deep ocean or inside planetary cores. The materials have potentially useful properties. For instance,  is a two-dimensional metal, made of layers of pure sodium and salt that can conduct electricity. The salt layers act as insulators while the sodium layers act as conductors.

See also

References

External links

 
Hypothetical particles
Gravity
Wormhole theory
Warp drive theory
Hypothetical objects